Live Tonite is a live album recorded by Canadian Rock Band Prism in 1978 at Detroit's Royal Oak Music Theater. The album features songs from Prism's first two studio albums "Prism" and "See Forever Eyes". The album was originally released on a special blue vinyl LP as well as black vinyl LP.

Track listing
 "See Forever Eyes" (Lindsay Mitchell, John Hall) - 4:57
 "Take Me to the Kaptin" (Jim Vallance) - 4:12
 "Open Soul Surgery" (J. Vallance) - 4:20
 "Freewill" (Tom Lavin) - 4:23
 "Vladivostok" (J. Vallance) - 5:45
 "You're Like The Wind" (J. Vallance) - 3:45
 "Flyin'" (Al Harlow) - 6:01
 "Nickels and Dimes" (L. Mitchell, A. Harlow) - 5:45
 "Spaceship Superstar" (J. Vallance) - 4:17
 "N-N-N-No!" (J. Vallance) - 3:47

Personnel

Prism

 Lindsay Mitchell –  lead guitar, backing vocals
 Ron Tabak – lead vocals
 John Hall – keyboards, backing vocals
 Al Harlow – bass, slide guitar, backing vocals
 Rocket Norton – drums

Horn Section

 Ralph Eppel — trombone
 Bruce Fairbairn — trumpet

Production

 Rolf Hennemann — Mixing Engineer
 Jerry Allen
 Arthur Stokes
 Allen Stoles
 John Naskicwicz

Prism Road Crew

 George Lambert — sound
 Jean Laloge — stage coordination
 Brock Woodman — lights

References
Citations

 https://www.discogs.com/Prism-Prism-Live-Tonite-At-Detroits-Royal-Oak/master/1241531

1978 live albums
Prism (band) albums